"Sometimes Always" is a song by the Scottish alternative rock group the Jesus and Mary Chain and the first single from the group's album Stoned & Dethroned. Written by William Reid, the song is a duet between Jim Reid and Mazzy Star's Hope Sandoval. The song was a moderate commercial hit in the UK while also making some noise on the alternative circuit in the US. It has since seen critical acclaim as one of the best songs from the Stoned & Dethroned album.

Background
"Sometimes Always" was written by Jesus and Mary Chain guitarist William Reid, who felt that the song sounded like a Lee Hazlewood and Nancy Sinatra duet. The band then recruited Mazzy Star vocalist Hope Sandoval to sing the female lead alongside Jesus and Mary Chain lead singer Jim Reid. William Reid commented, "We'd always liked Hope's voice. We asked her years ago to be on one of the records, but there was never a song that suited. Then this one came along and it felt right."

Initially, the band worried that the song was "a bit too cute, too light a story," according to William Reid. However, as he stated, "When we recorded it, Hope and Jim sang and they just transcended it." By the time the song was recorded, Sandoval was known to be a "good friend" to William, hinting at the pair's affair that would come to light. Sandoval would also appear alongside the band in the song's video, which was directed by Sophie Muller. Muller also directed the video for "Come On" and designed the album artwork for Stoned & Dethroned.

Release
"Sometimes Always" was selected by the band as the first single from their 1994 album Stoned & Dethroned. The single was released by Blanco y Negro Records on 18 July 1994 and reached  22 on the UK Single Chart. "Sometimes Always" peaked at No. 62 on the Australian ARIA Singles Chart in August 1994. It also reached No. 4 on the US Alternative Songs chart, the band's last song to appear on that chart.

A poster for the single can be seen in the Bottom episode "Terror" while the song itself appears in the 1995 film The Doom Generation.

Reception
"Sometimes Always" saw positive critical reception and was often named a highlight from Stoned & Dethroned. Ned Raggett of AllMusic wrote, Sometimes Always' does indeed make for a lovely little duet," while Drowned In Sound dubbed it the album's "best known and ultimately standout moment." Pitchfork also named the song a "standout" on Stoned & Dethroned, while Tom Breihan of Stereogum said that the song is a "classic" and that it "rules so hard."

Track listings
7-inch (NEG70)
 "Sometimes Always" (William Reid) – 2:32
 "The Perfect Crime" (Jim Reid) – 1:32

10-inch (NEG70TE), 12-inch (NEG70T) and CD (NEG70CD)
 "Sometimes Always" (W. Reid) – 2:32
 "The Perfect Crime" (J. Reid) – 1:32
 "Little Stars" (W. Reid) – 3:29
 "Drop-Re-Recorded" (W. Reid) – 1:50

Personnel
 Jim Reid – vocals, guitar, producer
 William Reid – guitar, producer
 Hope Sandoval - vocals ("Sometimes Always")
 Dick Meaney – engineer

Charts

Cover versions
The song was recorded as a duet by Courtney Jaye and Ben Bridwell of Band of Horses on Jaye's 2010 album, The Exotic Sounds of Courtney Jaye and by The Brakes on their 2005 album "Give Blood", duetting with Becki and Julia of The Pipettes. In 2020, Hatchie and The Pains of Being Pure at Heart recorded a duet cover.

References

The Jesus and Mary Chain songs
1994 singles
1994 songs
Blanco y Negro Records singles
Songs written by William Reid (musician)